Miltochrista coccinea is a moth of the family Erebidae. It was described by Frederic Moore in 1886. It is found in Assam, India.

References

coccinea
Moths described in 1886
Moths of Asia